NGC 4523 is a Magellanic spiral galaxy located about 35 to 50 million light-years away in the constellation Coma Berenices. It was discovered by astronomer Heinrich d'Arrest on April 19, 1865. NGC 4523 is a member of the Virgo Cluster. A distance of (13 ± 2 Mpc) for NGC 4523 was derived from using yellow supergiants in the galaxy as standard candles.

On December 23, 1999, a Type II supernova designated as SN 1999gq was detected in NGC 4523.

See also
 NGC 4571

References

External links

Unbarred spiral galaxies
Virgo Cluster
Coma Berenices
4523
041746
07713
Astronomical objects discovered in 1865
Discoveries by Heinrich Louis d'Arrest